Nina Kalezić (born 5 December 1996) is a Montenegrin former tennis player.

Kalezić has a career-high doubles ranking world No. 761, which she achieved on 9 May 2016.

Playing for Montenegro Fed Cup team , she has a win–loss record of 0–8.

ITF Circuit finals

Doubles (0–1)

National representation

Fed Cup
Kalezić made her Fed Cup debut for Montenegro in 2014, while the team was competing in the Europe/Africa Zone Group II, when she was 17 years and 132 days old.

Fed Cup

Singles (0–5)

Doubles (0–3)

References

External links
 
 
 

1996 births
Living people
Montenegrin female tennis players
Sportspeople from Podgorica